David B. Robertson is a former Michigan State Senator, representing the 14th district (formerly numbered as the 26th) from 2011 until 2019. He is a statutory member of the Genesee County Republican Party's executive committee.

Political career
In 2008, Robertson was term limited from serving additional terms in the Michigan State House and was succeeded by Paul H. Scott. In 2010, Robertson beat Democrat Paula Zelenko to win 26th senatorial district as the first Republican State Senator from Genesee County since 1974. The result was Robertson 45,360, Zelenko 33,769 votes.

References

Living people
Republican Party Michigan state senators
Republican Party members of the Michigan House of Representatives
20th-century American politicians
21st-century American politicians
Year of birth missing (living people)